Talkmon  is a South Korean reality show. The show airs every Monday at 10:50 pm (KST) on cable channel O'live & tvN starting from January 15, 2018. It was later changed to 11:00 pm. It is the spin off of Island Trio which was aired at the same time-slot previously. The program director of this show is same person who had created Strong Heart talk show.

Airtime

Synopsis
Talkmon is a one-to-one talk battle between expert speaker in entertainment industry, Talk Master and hidden speaker in the industry, Talk Monster. At the end of the battle, the one who unveils the best story is selected amongst the Talk Monsters to be the Kingsmon.

Hosts

Current MC 

 Kang Ho-dong (Episode 1 - present)
 Kim Hee-sun (Episode 5 - present)

Past MC 

 Jung Yong-hwa (Episode 1 - 4)

Production 
The idea of the show came out when the program director, Park Sang-hyuk was shooting for Island Trio, a healing travel show with Kang Ho-dong, Jung Yong-hwa & Kim Hee-sun.  Whilst Kang Ho-dong & Jung Yong-hwa joined in together for Talkmon, Kim Hee-sun is said to back off from the new show in order to maintain the freshness for Island Trio's season 2, which is scheduled to run within the same year, 2018. However, Kim Hee-sun is said to willingly fill in as a guest whenever there's an empty slots.

After Jung Yong-hwa's departure from the show, Kim Hee-sun is scheduled to record as the special MC on February 4, 2018, to fill in Jung Yong-hwa's absence and will be broadcast on February 12, 2018. It is later announced by O'live that she will become a fixed MC for the show instead of only one-time appearance.

MC Departure
MC Jung Yong-hwa voluntarily departed from the show's MCing due to his graduate school controversy and will be enlisting in military on March 5, 2018.  Jung's agency, FNC Entertainment announced:"Due to the controversy surrounding Yong-hwa, he's taking responsibility, and because he doesn't want it to negatively impact the program, he's decided to leave the show along with agreement from the producers. We once again deeply apologize for disappointing the producers, the cast, and the viewers." "Jung Yong-hwa will be notified of the entry (military enlistment) and will join on March 5th. As for '2018 JUNG YONG HWA LIVE [ROOM 622]' , after Hong Kong concert on January 27th, it is necessary to cancel all future overseas tour schedules. Thank you for your patience and understanding from the fans of Korea and abroad who have paid attention and spent your precious time."

Talk Masters

Episodes
Name sequence of Talk Masters & Talk Monsters are from left to right as seen on the show's seating arrangement.

Ratings 
In the tables below, the blue numbers represent the lowest ratings and the red numbers represent the highest ratings.

.

References

South Korean reality television series
2018 South Korean television series debuts